The Prix Alain-Grandbois or Alain Grandbois Prize is awarded each year to an author for a book of poetry. The jury is composed of three members of the Académie des lettres du Québec. It is named after writer Alain Grandbois.

Prize recipients
1988 - Pierre Morency, Effets personnels
1989 - Jean Royer, Poèmes d'amour
1990 - Juan Garcia, Corps du gloire
1991 - Jacques Brault, Il n'y a plus de chemin
1992 - Monique Bosco, Miserere
1993 - Anne Hébert, Le Jour n'a d'égal que la nuit
1994 - Gilbert Langevin, Le Cercle ouvert
1995 - Rachel Leclerc, Rabatteurs d'étoiles
1996 - Hélène Dorion, Sans bord, sans bout du monde
1997 - Claude Beausoleil, Grand hôtel des étrangers
1998 - Paul Chanel Malenfant, Fleuves
1999 - Hugues Corriveau, Le Livre du frère
2000 - Normand de Bellefeuille, La Marche de l'aveugle sans son chien
2001 - Martine Audet, Les tables
2002 - Michel Beaulieu, Trivialités
2003 - Danielle Fournier, Poèmes perdus en Hongrie
2004 - Jean-Philippe Bergeron, Visages de l'affolement
2005 - Robert Melançon,  Le Paradis des apparences
2006 - Fernand Ouellette, L'Inoubliable
2007 - François Charron, Ce qui nous abandonne
2008 - Nathalie Stephens, ...s'arrête? Je
2009 - Monique Deland, Miniatures, balles perdues et autres désordres
2010 - Paul Bélanger, Répit
2011 - Carole David, Manuel de poétique à l'intention des jeunes filles
2012 - Antoine Boisclair, Le bruissement des possibles
2013 - René Lapierre, Pour les désespérés seulement
2014 - Michaël Trahan, Nœud coulant
2015 - André Roy, La très grande solitude de l'écrivain pragois Franz Kafka
2016 - Rosalie Lessard, L'observatoire
2017 - Marie-Célie Agnant, Femmes des terres brûlées
2018 - Catherine Lalonde, La dévoration des fées
2019 - Catherine Harton, Les ordres de la nuit
2020 - Jean-Marc Desgent, Misère et dialogue des bêtes

References

External links
Prix Alain-Grandbois

 
Alain-Grandbois
French-language literature in Canada
Quebec awards
French-language literary awards